Miss República Dominicana 1983 was held on August 20, 1982. Nineteen candidates competed for the national crown. The winner represented the Dominican Republic at the Miss Universe 1983, Señorita República Dominicana Mundo  Miss World 1983, and Señorita República Dominicana Café Reinado Internacional del Café 1983.

Results

Delegates

Azua - Yonoris Maribel Estrella Florentino
Distrito Nacional - Annie Miguelina Hurtado
Distrito Nacional - Arlette Canaán Decamps 
Distrito Nacional - Bernardita García Smerter
Distrito Nacional - Ivette Peña Martínez
Distrito Nacional - Jenny Domínguez
Distrito Nacional - María Alexandra Astwood Tueni
Distrito Nacional - Nuria Esperanza Piera Gainza
Distrito Nacional -Deisy Xiomara Rodríguez Méndez
Duarte - Mariela Carmen Sánchez Mota
Independencia - Rosario Santana
La Altagracia - María Altagracia Polanco
María Trinidad Sánchez - Sandra Alvarado
Monte Cristi - Marilyn Morel Grullón
Peravia - Aura Ines Restituyo
Puerto Plata - Martha Durán
San Pedro de Macorís - Nidez Ramírez
Santiago - Mariana Emilia Mejía Ricart
Santiago - Rossi Falcón
Valverde - Hildia Moreno

External links
 https://web.archive.org/web/20090211102742/http://ogm.elcaribe.com.do/ogm/consulta.aspx

Miss Dominican Republic
1983 beauty pageants
1983 in the Dominican Republic